The 2021 European Junior & U23 Weightlifting Championships took place in Rovaniemi, Finland from 24 September to 3 October 2021. In total, 117 male and 91 female weightlifters from 35 countries competed in the under-23 competitions and 154 male and 118 female weightlifters from 38 countries competed in the junior competitions.

Team ranking

Medal summary

Juniors

Men

Women

Under-23

Men

Women

Medal table
Ranking by Big (Total result) medals

Ranking by all medals: Big (Total result) and Small (Snatch and Clean & Jerk)

References

External links
Official website
Result book

European Junior & U23 Weightlifting Championships
European Junior & U23
2021 in Finnish sport
International weightlifting competitions hosted by Finland
Sports competitions in Rovaniemi
European Junior and U23 Weightlifting Championships
European Junior and U23 Weightlifting Championships